Ronald Chernow (born March 3, 1949) is an American writer, journalist and biographer. He has written bestselling historical non-fiction biographies.

He won the 2011 Pulitzer Prize for Biography and the 2011 American History Book Prize for his 2010 book Washington: A Life. He is also the recipient of the National Book Award for Nonfiction for his 1990 book The House of Morgan: An American Banking Dynasty and the Rise of Modern Finance. His biographies of Alexander Hamilton (2004) and John D. Rockefeller (1998) were both nominated for National Book Critics Circle Awards, while the former served as the inspiration for the popular Hamilton musical, for which Chernow worked as a historical consultant. Another book, The Warburgs: The Twentieth-Century Odyssey of a Remarkable Jewish Family, was honored with the 1993 George S. Eccles Prize for Excellence in Economic Writing. As a freelance journalist, he has written over sixty articles in national publications.

Personal background 
Ronald Chernow was born on March 3, 1949, in Brooklyn, New York. His father Israel was the owner of a discount store and creator of a stock brokerage firm; his mother Ruth was a bookkeeper. He is brother to Bart Chernow and uncle to Shandee Chernow. He is of Jewish descent. Chernow was voted "Most Likely to Succeed", and was Class President and Valedictorian when he graduated in 1966 from Forest Hills High School in Queens, New York. Chernow graduated summa cum laude from Yale University in 1970 and Pembroke College at Cambridge University with degrees in English literature. He began but did not finish a PhD program. He says that in politics he is a "disgruntled Democrat" and gives his religion as "Jewish, though more in the breach than the observance."

He married Valerie Stearn in 1979; she died in January 2006. Valerie S. Chernow was an assistant professor of languages and social sciences at the New York City College of Technology.

Ron Chernow has received honorary degrees from Long Island University, Marymount Manhattan College, Hamilton College, Washington College, and Skidmore College.

Professional background 
Chernow began his career as a freelance journalist. He wrote more than 60 articles in national newspapers and magazines from 1973 to 1982. In the mid-1980s, he put his writing pursuits aside when he began serving as the director of financial policy studies with the Twentieth Century Fund, which is based in New York City. In 1986, he left the organization and refocused his efforts on writing. In addition to his background in writing nonfiction and biographies, Chernow continues to contribute articles to The New York Times and The Wall Street Journal. He has also provided commentary on business, politics, and finance on national radio and television shows, while also appearing as an expert in documentary films.

Business and finance

The House of Morgan
In 1990, Chernow published his first book, The House of Morgan: An American Banking Dynasty and the Rise of Modern Finance, which traces the history of four generations of the J.P. Morgan financial empire. The reviewer for The New York Times Book Review said, "As a portrait of finance, politics and the world of avarice and ambition on Wall Street, the book has the movement and tension of an epic novel. It is, quite simply, a tour de force." The House of Morgan: An American Banking Dynasty and the Rise of Modern Finance was honored with the National Book Award for Nonfiction.

The Warburgs
In 1993, Chernow published The Warburgs: The Twentieth-Century Odyssey of a Remarkable Jewish Family, which is an account of the Warburg family, who immigrated to the US from Germany in 1938. The Warburg family was a prominent financial dynasty of German Jewish descent, known for their accomplishments in physics, classical music, art history, pharmacology, physiology, finance, private equity and philanthropy. The book was awarded the Columbia Business School's George S. Eccles Prize for Excellence in Economic Writing. It was additionally named as one of the year's ten best works by the American Library Association and a Notable Book by The New York Times.

The Death of the Banker
Chernow's 1997 collection of essays, The Death of the Banker, touched upon his earlier writings and chronicled "the decline and fall of the great financial dynasties and the triumph of the small investor" (to quote its subtitle).

Titan: The Life of John D. Rockefeller, Sr.
 

In 1998, Chernow published the 774-page Titan: The Life of John D. Rockefeller, Sr., which was selected by Time and The New York Times as one of the year's ten best books. A prominent figure in American business history, Rockefeller was an industrialist, philanthropist, and the founder of the Standard Oil Company. The book reflected Chernow's continued interest in financial history, especially when shaped by compelling and influential individuals. The book remained on The New York Times Best Seller list for 16 weeks. Time called it "one of the great American biographies".

American politics

Alexander Hamilton
In 2004, Chernow published Alexander Hamilton. The biography was nominated for a National Book Critics Circle Award and was named as the winner of the inaugural George Washington Book Prize for early American history. It remained on The New York Times Best Seller list for three months. In his review for the Journal of American History, Stephen B. Presser, who is professor of business law emeritus at Northwestern University, wrote:

The biography was adapted into a Tony award-winning musical, Hamilton, by Lin-Manuel Miranda, which opened on Broadway in August 2015. Chernow served as historical consultant to the production.

George Washington
Chernow's 904-page Washington: A Life was released on October 5, 2010. It won the Pulitzer Prize for Biography and the American History Book Prize. Professor Gordon S. Wood, renowned scholar of the Founding era, wrote:

Ulysses S. Grant
In 2011, Chernow signed a deal to write a comprehensive biography on Ulysses S. Grant. Chernow explained his transition from writing about George Washington to Grant: "Makes some sense as progression. Towering general of Revolution to towering general of Civil War. Both two-term presidents, though with very different results." Grant was released on October 10, 2017, and the biography strongly argues against the conventional wisdom that Grant was an "adequate president, a dull companion and a roaring drunk." The book received overwhelmingly positive reviews and was named by The New York Times as one of the 10 Best Books of 2017.

Board memberships 
In 1990, Chernow became a member of the PEN American Center. In 2006, he was named as the President of the Board of Trustees, succeeding novelist Salman Rushdie.

Honors and awards 
 1990: National Book Award for Nonfiction for The House of Morgan: An American Banking Dynasty and the Rise of Modern Finance (winner)
 1993: George S. Eccles Prize for Excellence in Economic Writing for The Warburgs: The Twentieth-Century Odyssey of a Remarkable Jewish Family (winner)
 1998: National Book Critics Circle Award for Titan: The Life of John D. Rockefeller, Sr. (nominated)
 2004: George Washington Book Prize for Alexander Hamilton (winner)
 2004: National Book Critics Circle Award for Alexander Hamilton (nominated)
 2011: Pulitzer Prize for Biography for Washington: A Life (winner)
 2011: American History Book Prize for Washington: A Life (winner)
 2013: BIO Award from Biographers International Organization for advancing the art and craft of biography.
 2015: National Humanities Medal
2016: Benjamin Harrison Presidential Site Advancing American Democracy (winner)
2017: Gold Medal Honoree from the National Institute of Social Sciences
2017: The Lincoln Forum's Richard Nelson Current Award of Achievement
2018: American Academy of Arts and Letters Gold Medal in Biography
2019: Golden Plate Award of the American Academy of Achievement

Published works

Books

Articles

Filmography 
 1996: Biography, "J. Pierpont Morgan: Emperor of Wall Street" (documentary), as himself
 2000: The American Experience, "The Rockefellers: Part 1" (documentary), as advisor
 2000: The American Experience, "The Rockefellers: Part 2" (documentary), as advisor
 2007: The American Experience, "Alexander Hamilton" (documentary), as advisor
 2010: Tavis Smiley, "October 12, 2010 episode" (talk show), as guest 
 2010: Rediscovering Alexander Hamilton (documentary), as himself/historian
 2020: Grant, as writer

References

Further reading
 "Ron Chernow" in Contemporary Authors Online (Gale, 2011)

External links
 
 
 
Ron Chernow at Penguin Group website
The Founding Fathers Versus the Tea Party by Ron Chernow

Ron Chernow remarks at the Washington Press Corps Dinner 2019

1949 births
Alumni of Pembroke College, Cambridge
American biographers
20th-century American historians
20th-century American male writers
21st-century American historians
21st-century American male writers
Jewish American writers
20th-century American journalists
American male journalists
Historians from New York (state)
Jewish American historians
Journalists from New York City
Living people
American male biographers
National Book Award winners
Pulitzer Prize for Biography or Autobiography winners
Writers from Brooklyn
Yale University alumni
National Humanities Medal recipients
American male non-fiction writers
21st-century American Jews
Members of the American Academy of Arts and Letters